"Algo Me Gusta de Ti" (English: I Like Something About You) is a song by Puerto Rican duo Wisin & Yandel featuring American singers Chris Brown and T-Pain, released as the second single the former's album Líderes. There is an English version, entitled "Something About You," which also features Chris Brown and T-Pain. It spent 14 weeks at number-one on the Billboard Hot Latin Songs and 12 weeks on Billboard Latin Pop Airplay, becoming their longest reigning number-one single in both charts. Carlos Quintana called this as one of the best tracks of Lideres.

Music video 
The video was released on August 17, 2012 and was directed by Jessy Terrero. It begins with a Latino millionaire taunting his nerdy servant cleaning his swimming pool. After his boss leaves, the servant takes off his clothes after and jumps into the swimming pool, where he magically is teleported to a party with Wisin & Yandel, Chris Brown and T-Pain singing and dancing.

Charts

Weekly charts

Year-end charts

Decade-end charts

See also
List of Billboard number-one Latin songs of 2012
List of Billboard number-one Latin songs of 2013

References

2012 singles
Wisin & Yandel songs
T-Pain songs
Chris Brown songs
Music videos directed by Jessy Terrero
Machete Music singles
Songs written by Wisin
Songs written by Yandel
Spanglish songs